Martin Luther King Jr. Day (officially Birthday of Martin Luther King, Jr., and often referred to shorthand as MLK Day) is a federal holiday in the United States marking the birthday of Martin Luther King Jr. It is observed on the third Monday of January each year. Born in 1929, King's actual birthday is January 15 (which in 1929 fell on a Tuesday). The holiday is similar to holidays set under the Uniform Monday Holiday Act. The earliest Monday for this holiday is January 15 and the latest is January 21.

King was the chief spokesperson for nonviolent activism in the Civil Rights Movement, which protested racial discrimination in federal and state law. The campaign for a federal holiday in King's honor began soon after his assassination in 1968. President Ronald Reagan signed the holiday into law in 1983, and it was first observed three years later on January 20, 1986. At first, some states resisted observing the holiday as such, giving it alternative names or combining it with other holidays. It was officially observed in all 50 states for the first time in 2000.

History

Proposals

The idea of Martin Luther King Jr. Day as a holiday was promoted by labor unions in contract negotiations. After King's death, Representative John Conyers (a Democrat from Michigan) and Senator Edward Brooke (a Republican from Massachusetts) introduced a bill in Congress to make King's birthday a national holiday. The bill first came to a vote in the U.S. House of Representatives in 1979. However, it fell five votes short of the number needed for passage. Two of the main arguments mentioned by opponents were that a paid holiday for federal employees would be too expensive and that a holiday to honor a private citizen would be contrary to longstanding tradition (King had never held public office). Only two other figures have national holidays in the U.S. honoring them: George Washington and Christopher Columbus.

Soon after, the King Center turned to support from the corporate community and the general public. The success of this strategy was cemented when musician Stevie Wonder released the single "Happy Birthday" to popularize the campaign in 1980 and hosted the Rally for Peace Press Conference in 1981. Six million signatures were collected for a petition to Congress to pass the law, termed by a 2006 article in The Nation as "the largest petition in favor of an issue in U.S. history".

Senators Jesse Helms and John Porter East (both North Carolina Republicans) led the opposition to the holiday and questioned whether King was important enough to receive such an honor. Helms criticized King's opposition to the Vietnam War and accused him of espousing "action-oriented Marxism". Helms led a filibuster against the bill and on October 3, 1983, submitted a 300-page document to the Senate alleging that King had associations with communists. Democratic New York Senator Daniel Patrick Moynihan declared Helms' document a "packet of filth", threw it on the Senate floor, and stomped on it.

Federal passage
President Ronald Reagan originally opposed the holiday, citing cost concerns. When asked to comment on Helms' accusations that King was a communist, the president said "We'll know in thirty-five years, won't we," referring to the eventual release of FBI surveillance tapes that had previously been sealed. But on November 2, 1983, Reagan signed a bill into law, proposed by Representative Katie Hall of Indiana, to create a federal holiday honoring King. The final vote in the House of Representatives on August 2, 1983, was 338–90 (242–4 in the House Democratic Caucus and 89–77 in the House Republican Conference) with 5 members voting present or abstaining, while the final vote in the Senate on October 19, 1983, was 78–22 (41–4 in the Senate Democratic Caucus and 37–18 in the Senate Republican Conference), both veto-proof margins. The holiday was observed for the first time on January 20, 1986. It is observed on the third Monday of January.

The bill also established the "Martin Luther King, Jr. Federal Holiday Commission" to oversee observance of the holiday, and Coretta Scott King, King's wife, was made a member of this commission for life by President George H. W. Bush in May 1989.

State-level passage
Although the federal holiday honoring King was signed into law in 1983 and took effect three years later, not every U.S. state chose to observe the January holiday at the state level until 1991, when the New Hampshire legislature created "Civil Rights Day" and abolished its April "Fast Day". In 1999, New Hampshire became the last state to name a holiday after King, which they first celebrated in January 2000the first nationwide celebration of the day with this name.

In 1986, Arizona Governor Bruce Babbitt, a Democrat, created a paid state MLK holiday in Arizona by executive order just before he left office, but in 1987, his Republican successor Evan Mecham, citing an attorney general's opinion that Babbitt's order was illegal, reversed Babbitt's decision days after taking office. Later that year, Mecham proclaimed the third Sunday in January to be "Martin Luther King Jr./Civil Rights Day" in Arizona, albeit as an unpaid holiday. This proposal was rejected by the state Senate the following year. In 1990, Arizona voters were given the opportunity to vote on giving state employees a paid MLK holiday. That same year, the National Football League threatened to move Super Bowl XXVII, which was planned for Arizona in 1993, if the MLK holiday was voted down. In the November 1990 election, the voters were offered two King Day options: Proposition 301, which replaced Columbus Day on the list of paid state holidays, and Proposition 302, which merged Lincoln's and Washington's birthdays into one paid holiday to make room for MLK Day. Both measures failed to pass, with only 49% of voters approving Prop 302, the more popular of the two options; although some who voted "no" on 302 voted "yes" on Prop 301. Consequently, the state lost the chance to host Super Bowl XXVII, which was subsequently held at the Rose Bowl in Pasadena, California. In a 1992 referendum, the voters, this time given only one option for a paid King Day, approved state-level recognition of the holiday.

On May 2, 2000, South Carolina governor Jim Hodges signed a bill to make King's birthday an official state holiday. South Carolina was the last state to recognize the day as a paid holiday for all state employees. Before the bill, employees could choose between celebrating Martin Luther King Jr. Day or one of three Confederate holidays.

Alternative names
While all states now observe the holiday, some did not name the day after King. For example, in New Hampshire, the holiday was known as "Civil Rights Day" until 1999, when the State Legislature voted to change the name of the holiday to Martin Luther King Day.

Several additional states have chosen to combine commemorations of King's birthday with other observances:
In Alabama: "Robert E. Lee/Martin Luther King Birthday".
In Arizona: "Martin Luther King Jr./Civil Rights Day".
 In Arkansas: it was known as "Dr. Martin Luther King, Jr.'s Birthday and Robert E. Lee's Birthday" from 1985 to 2017. Legislation in March 2017 changed the name of the state holiday to "Dr. Martin Luther King, Jr.'s Birthday" and moved the commemoration of Lee to October.
In Idaho: "Martin Luther King Jr.–Idaho Human Rights Day".
In Mississippi: "Martin Luther King's and Robert E. Lee's Birthdays".
In New Hampshire: "Martin Luther King Jr. Civil Rights Day".
 In Virginia: it was known as Lee–Jackson–King Day, combining King's birthday with the established Lee–Jackson Day. In 2000, Lee–Jackson Day was moved to the Friday before Martin Luther King Jr. Day, establishing Martin Luther King Jr. Day as a holiday in its own right.  Lee-Jackson Day was eliminated in 2020.
In Wyoming: it is known as "Martin Luther King Jr./Wyoming Equality Day". Liz Byrd, the first black woman in the Wyoming legislature, introduced a bill in 1991 for Wyoming to recognize MLK day as a paid state holiday; however, she compromised on the name because her peers would not pass it otherwise.

Observance

Workplace leave

Overall, as of 2019, 45% of employers gave employees the day off. The reasons for doing so have varied, ranging from the recent addition of the holiday to its occurrence just two weeks after the week between Christmas and New Year's Day, when many businesses are closed for part or all of it. The New York Stock Exchange and NASDAQ both close for trading, and banks are generally closed. Additionally, many schools and places of higher education are closed for classes; others remain open but may hold seminars or celebrations of King's message. The observance of MLK Day has led to some colleges and universities extending their Christmas break to include the day as part of the break. Some employers use MLK Day as a floating or movable holiday.

MLK Day of Service

The national "Martin Luther King, Jr., National Day of Service" was started by former Pennsylvania U.S. Senator Harris Wofford and Atlanta Congressman John Lewis, who co-authored the King Holiday and Service Act. The federal legislation challenges Americans to transform the King Holiday into a day of citizen action volunteer service in honor of King. The federal legislation was signed into law by President Bill Clinton on August 23, 1994. Since 1996, Wofford's former state office director, Todd Bernstein, has been directing the annual Greater Philadelphia King Day of Service, the largest event in the nation honoring King.

Since 1994, the day of service has been coordinated nationally by AmeriCorps, a federal agency, which provides grants to organizations that coordinate service activities on MLK Day.

The only other official national day of service in the U.S., as designated by the government, is September 11 National Day of Service (9/11 Day).

Speeches
Cesar Chavez campaigned with him to call attention to the economic needs of farmworkers in the United States. Chavez used his speech on this day in 1990 to again call attention to the similarity between his campaign regarding pesticide issues and King's campaigns. He later was honored with the creation of Cesar Chavez Day in imitation of this holiday.

Outside the United States

Canada
The City of Toronto government in Ontario officially recognizes Martin Luther King Jr. Day, although not as a paid holiday: all government services and businesses remain open. The Ottawa municipal government in Ontario officially began observing this national holiday on January 26, 2005.

Israel
In 1984, during a visit by the U.S. Sixth Fleet, Navy chaplain Rabbi Arnold Resnicoff conducted the first Israeli presidential ceremony in commemoration of Martin Luther King Jr. Day, held in the President's Residence, Jerusalem. Aura Herzog, wife of Israel's then-President Chaim Herzog, noted that she was especially proud to host this special event, because Israel had a national forest in honor of King, and that Israel and King shared the idea of "dreams." Resnicoff continued this theme in his remarks during the ceremony, quoting the verse from Genesis, spoken by the brothers of Joseph when they saw their brother approach, "Behold the dreamer comes; let us slay him and throw him into the pit, and see what becomes of his dreams." Resnicoff noted that, from time immemorial, there have been those who thought they could kill the dream by slaying the dreamer, but – as the example of King's life shows – such people are always wrong.

Japan
Martin Luther King Jr. Day is observed in the Japanese city of Hiroshima. In January 2005, Mayor Tadatoshi Akiba held a special banquet at the mayor's office as an act of unifying his city's call for peace with King's message of human rights.

Netherlands
Every year since 1987, the Dr. Martin Luther King Tribute and Dinner has been held in Wassenaar, The Netherlands. The Tribute includes young people and veterans of the Civil Rights Movement as well as music.  It always ends with everyone holding hands in a circle and singing "We Shall Overcome". The Tribute is held on the last Sunday in January.

Dates
1986–2103

See also

Blue Monday (date), which generally coincides with Martin Luther King Jr. Day
Civil rights movement in popular culture
List of African-American holidays

General holidays
 List of holidays by country
 List of holidays commemorating individuals
 List of multinational festivals and holidays
 Public holidays in the United States

Volunteer day events
 Global Youth Service Day
 Good Deeds Day
 International Volunteer Day
 International Year of Volunteers
 Mitzvah Day
 National Philanthropy Day (U.S. and Canada)
 Random Acts of Kindness Day
 Sewa Day
 Education and Sharing Day
 Make A Difference Day
 World Kindness Day

References

Further reading
 
Weiss, Jana (2017). "Remember, Celebrate, and Forget? The Martin Luther King Day and the Pitfalls of Civil Religion", Journal of American Studies, Remember, Celebrate, and Forget? The Martin Luther King Day and the Pitfalls of Civil Religion .

External links

Martin Luther King Jr. Federal Holiday Commission at the Federal Register
Martin Luther King Jr. Day of Service official government site
King Holiday and Service Act of 1994  at THOMAS
Remarks on Signing the King Holiday and Service Act of 1994, President William J. Clinton, The American Presidency Project, August 23, 1994
 
The King Center for Nonviolent Social Change
N.H.'s Martin Luther King Jr. Day Didn't Happen Without A Fight

1983 establishments in the United States
Day
Public holidays in the United States
Federal holidays in the United States
United States flag flying days
Holidays and observances by scheduling (nth weekday of the month)
January observances
Monday observances
Coretta Scott King
Birthdays